Maria Olărașu (born 28 May 2000) is a Moldovan sprint canoer. 

She qualified at the 2020 Summer Olympics, in the C-1 200 meters, and C-2 500 meters. 

She competed at the 2017 ICF Canoe Sprint World Championships.

References

External links 
 Maria OLARASU - Canoe Sprint Athlete (canoeicf.com)

Living people
2000 births
Moldovan female canoeists
Olympic canoeists of Moldova
Canoeists at the 2020 Summer Olympics